Dorcadion johannisfranci is a species of beetle in the family Cerambycidae. It was described by Pesarini and Sabbadini in 2007. It is known from Greece and Turkey.

See also 
 Dorcadion

References 

johannisfranci
Beetles described in 2007